The eighth season of the Dutch TV series Wie is de Mol? ("Who is the Mole?") aired in the winter of 2008. This was the first season with new host, Pieter Jan Hagens, replacing  after a short two season stint as presenter for the series. The location of the season was Mexico, the third time the series had filmed in the Americas, following Canada and Argentina in season 4 and season 6 respectively. The season premiered on January 3, 2008. While the Finale and Reunion aired between February 28, 2008 and March 6, 2008. During the Reunion, Edo Brunner was revealed to have won the season, earning a grand total of €20,375.-. Brunner had successfully unmasked Dennis Weening as the Mole, with Regina Romeijn as the losing Finalist.

Format
Followed the same format as its Belgian predecessor, the season had ten Dutch celebrities travel to Mexico to complete Assignments to earn money for the group pot. However, one of the ten is the titular Mole (de Mol), the one designated to sabotage the assignments and cause the group to earn the least amount of money for the winner's pot as possible. Every few days, players would take a 20-question multiple choice test about the identity of the Mole. Once the test is complete, the candidates await their results in an Execution ceremony. The candidate with the worst score is executed from the game, while in the event of the tie the candidate who completed their test the slowest is executed. The season plays out until there are 3 remaining candidates, where they must complete a final test (consisting of 40 questions). The candidate with the highest score, or had completed their test the fastest in a tie, is declared the winner and receives the group's pot.

The main twist of the season was the introduction of Topitos, small tokens in eight different colours that the candidates could collect throughout the season's Assignments. If one of the candidates manages to collect 8 Topitos to form a Topo (either all the same colour, or 8 different colours) and submits it to Hagens before an Execution ceremony, that candidate earns an Exemption from that Episode's test. Meanwhile, any Topitos that an Executed candidate has in their possession is removed from the game, reducing the candidates' potential in earning a Topo Exemption. The candidates may only submit one complete Topo throughout the season, and once they have succeeded all other outstanding Topitos are removed from the game as well.

Candidates

Future appearances
Patrick Martens returned for Wie is de Mol? Renaissance in September 2020.

Candidates Progress
The order in which the candidates learned their results are indicated in the table below.

 The candidate is the winner of Wie is de Mol 2008.
 The candidate was unmasked as The Mole.
 The candidate was the losing finalist of Wie is de Mol 2008.
  The candidate saw a Green Screen to proceeded to the next Episode.
 The candidate received an Exemption to automatically proceed to the next Episode.
 The candidate used Jokers for this test, and saw a Green Screen to proceed to the next Episode.
 The candidate used Jokers for this test, however, they did not see a Green Screen before the Executed player saw their Red Screen. Thus they proceeded to the next Episode.
 The candidate did not see a Green Screen before the Executed player saw their Red Screen. Thus they proceeded to the next Episode.
 The candidate was executed from the game and sent home.
Notes

Episodes
For more information, see: List of seasons of "Wie is de Mol?"

Notes

Assignments

Episode 1

Introductory Questions - Max. €2,500.- Hagens told the candidates that he had questions for them. Every question the candidates got right, €250 would be added to the pot.

Coen, Annette, and Regina got their questions right which put €750 into the pot.

Climbers and Bikers - Max. €5,000.- The candidates were separated into groups of five: the climbers and the bikers. Each climber chose one biker to be paired with. Every climber who reached the top of the mountain before their respective biker would put €1,000 into the pot.

Georgina, Nicolette, and Dunya reached the top before their partners did, thus €3,000 was put into the pot.

Joker Offers Pieter Jan presented the group a stack of 17 jokers. One at a time, Hagens would offer a joker from the stack to the center of the table, where at that time any of the candidates could take the offer. Each candidate could only successfully claim jokers once. Pieter Jan would judge if there is a tight scramble. Once all the jokers have been claimed, Hagens told the candidates that if everyone anonymously hands in their jokers during the first test, the group would earn a group exemption. The jokers were only valid from Episode 2 onwards. The catch is that for every joker that is handed in will cost €100.- from the pot.

After Nicolette received a Red screen at the Execution, Pieter Jan revealed that only 10 jokers had been submitted, leading to her execution and €1,000.- removed from the pot.

Episode 2

Crap Shooters - Max. €3,000.-
Candidates took turns shooting at three rows of bottles. They can either shoot at "topitos", money, or the names of the candidates. Each candidate has two rounds to fire a single bullet. If a Candidate's bottle is struck, all earnings they made in the assignment are erased.

After two rounds of shooting, €1,525.- was earned for the pot.

Broken Telephone - Max. €3,000.-
The candidates had to split into three teams of duos, with the remaining team requiring a short and tall person. Annette fell ill the morning of the assignment, and could not participate in the assignment. The short and tall team had to pick three Candidates' names and, in a telephone-like manner, had to telegraph these names across a large dam through the three teams. The final team has to relay the names to Pieter Jan at the end of the assignment. For every correct name given to Pieter Jan, €1,000.- goes to the pot.

The group failed the assignment and earned nothing for the pot.

Excess Baggage
After the last assignment, Annette rejoined the group as they started preparing for a camp night out near the Dam. Hagen announced that the candidates were only allowed to take 100 kg (220 lbs) of luggage in combined total with them before they could set up camp. The group could earn money depending on how much the last bag weighs. For every kilogram that the last person has in their bag adds €100 to the pot. However, if the last bag breaks past the 100 kg limit, no money is earned for the pot.

The group failed the assignment and earned nothing for the pot.

Episode 3

Topito Gamble
As with the Joker Offers on Day 2, Pieter Jan offered topitos to the candidates. They were hidden underneath cups on a table. Some hid topitos and some hid nothing. At any point, a candidate could call out for whatever cup Pieter Jan reveals, but they can only successfully call out for one cup's contents of topitos. The assignment ends when all candidates have claimed a cup.

Sentence Walk - Max. €4,000.-
Candidates received two words, one to put on their chest and the other to put on their back. They then had to go out into the street and find each other to form a sentence. They would receive €250 per word in their complete sentence.

€2,250.- was earned for the group's pot.

Hunted - Max. €5,000.-
The candidates were brought to a field with 5 open spaces with flags worth €500.- each. Hidden in the field are 3 Hunters with red flags that will hunt down the candidates. Divided into three groups, the first group of three are tasked with creating safe spaces by raising a flag in each open space. The second group of three are then tasked to cut down the flags and bring them back, each representing money with a specific multiplier attached. The third group are stationed in a tower above the field, being able to spot the Hunters from above and inform each group. If a candidate is tagged by a Hunter, then they are out of the assignment; if a candidate in the second group is tagged while in possession of a flag, the money is also out of the assignment.

€500.- was earned for the group's pot.

Episode 4

A Thousand Pictures... - Max. €2,500.-
When the candidates checked into their new hotel, they were divided into 3 duos and one solo room. In Patrick's hotel room, there were thousanda of pictures on the walls from the season so far and a suitcase with a tape recorder. Dunya and Regina's room had a suspicious Alarm Clock. Coen and Edo's room had their television showcasing a series of pictures on its screen. Dennis and Joris' room appeared to have nothing, except a cassette tape. The cassette tape informed the group that they had to look around their rooms for money. €2,500.- lay inside a safe in Patrick's room which they had to crack its code using the pictures that built a picture of Pieter Jan himself. The collage revealed the photograph the group had to find which had the safe code written on the back. Once the alarm clock went off, the assignment was over.

The group failed the assignment and nothing was earned for the group's pot.

Bomb Defusals
Taken to an abandoned location, the Candidates were informed that they could defuse bombs to earn money and Topitos. With a 1 hour time limit, the group must solve and defuse as many bombs as possible, with a warning that most of the bombs explode after 45 minutes. If a candidate is hit by the bomb's explosion, they were out of the rest of the assignment.

€2,100.- was earned for the group's pot.

Candlelight with the Mole
Pieter Jan asked each candidate a question about the game so far. Each candidate gets an opportunity to then ask the Mole a Yes or No question in front of two candles. If they were correct, the Mole will answer truthfully, if not, the Mole will lie. Anonymously, the Mole answered by either extinguishing the candle on the left, which meant "Yes", or by extinguishing the candle on the right, which meant "No".

Episode 5

Reading Roller Coaster - Max. Unknown
The candidates received one envelope each, and inside was a card with a question on one side and an answer on the back. They had to match their question with someone else's correct answer while riding a roller coaster. They could not open the envelopes until they reached the top of the incline of the coaster with a red sign, and had to immediately stop all conversation when the roller coaster came to a complete stop. Everyone who got it right was able to know how to pass the assignment. When questioned by Pieter Jan for the answers, the candidates who answered correctly would be taken aside to be given the instructions for the next round. The candidates again received envelopes, but this time there were numbers inside. The solution was to add all the numbers together while on the roller coaster. If the group supplied the correct number to Pieter Jan, they would successfully complete the assignment.

The group failed the assignment, and nothing was earned for the group's pot.

Luxurious Buyout
The candidates were dropped off at the fanciest, most expensive hotel in Mexico. There, each candidate were offered by Pieter Jan to anonymously decide whether they wanted to spend the night at the hotel and/or buy themselves an exemption for €1,000.- out of the pot.

Everyone refused the offer to stay in the hotel, but Regina bought for the exemption and €1,000.- was removed from the group's pot.

Locate the Exempt - Max. €3,500.-
As Regina accepted the Exemption offer from Pieter Jan, she was moved to a secret location. If the candidates were able to find Regina within one and a half hours, she would lose her exemption. The candidates were split into two duos and Joris. The duos received $500 and phones to contact each other with, but no one knew what anybody's phone numbers were. The duos had to relay their phone numbers to Joris, who was standing on top of a tower in the middle of the city. Joris, knowing Regina's current location and address, could then relay the information to the duos. If any of the candidates managed to reach Regina's location in time, €2,500.- was put into the pot and she would lose her exemption worth €1,000.-.

The group successfully completed the assignment, and €2,500.- was earned for the group's pot, with the €1,000.- from Regina's exemption along with the winnings.

Exemption Gamble
The candidates were given the option to use Regina's exemption on one candidate of their choice, but it would remove €1,000.- out of the pot again. The catch was, if the candidate with the exemption receives a Green Screen at the next Execution, the execution continues and someone goes home. If the exempt candidate receives a Red Screen, no one goes home.

The group used the Exemption, and €1,000.- was removed from the group's pot.

Episode 6

Gamblers of Xochimilco - Max. €2,000.-
The candidates were split into two groups: the gamblers (Dennis and Patrick) and the players (Dunya, Edo, Joris, and Regina). After they arrived at the Chinampa of Xochimilco, the players were given $200 and were told to turn that into $1,000 in two hours. The gamblers had to make an initial bet based on their certainty in the players. After every half hour, they could choose to stay at their current bet or double it. After making the initial bet of €500, they doubled it twice and stayed the third time, ending with the final bet of €2,000.

The group successfully completed the assignment, and €2,000 was earned for the group's pot.

Taxis Assemble - Max €2,500.-
All six candidates received a phone, but only Patrick and Regina got everyone's phone numbers. Four remaining candidates got into taxis with a letter on top of it and headed to Zócalo where Patrick and Regina were waiting. Their task was to organize the others' cars so that they pass the traffic light at the same time, clearly spelling the word "TAXI". If they successfully spell the word within one hour, the group would receive €2,500.-.

The group successfully completed the assignment, and €2,500.- was earned for the group's pot.

Assignment Recall - Max. €6,000.-
Before the assignment began, the group had to pick between Envelope 1 and 2. Envelope 1 said, "Every candidate that does not reach the end of this assignment costs €250 from the pot." Envelope 2 said, "Every candidate that does make it to the end, earns €500 for the pot." The assignment was for the candidates to recall each assignment in sequential order. If someone was incorrect, they had to step back, and the rest had to start the recall from the beginning again. The assignment ends when the group either recalls all the assignments in order, or when the entire group gets the order wrong. Everyone failed and €1,500 was deducted from the pot. Pieter Jan then gathered the group after a short break. Like déjà vu he offered the group a choice between the two envelopes. After picking Envelope 2 this time, it read the same thing as Envelope 1 the first time around. The group had to repeat the assignment again.

The group failed the assignment twice, and €3,000.- was removed from the group's pot.

Episode 7

Piñata del Carmen - Max. €4,000.-
After flying to Cancún, Mexico the group divided into two groups. Two candidates were then flown to Playa del Carmen and were instructed to put €1,500.- inside a piñata. They then had to arrange the various piñatas so that theirs' with money inside of it would stand out among the rest. Meanwhile, the three remaining candidates had to drive to Playa del Carmen based on a cryptic GPS route. Upon arrival, the Drivers would receive €2,500.-. Any wrong turn or mistake would cost the Drivers €250.- per mistake. When the Drivers arrive, they must break the piñata that other team had selected. If they break the correct piñata, they would receive the hidden €1,500.-.

The Drivers made two mistakes, and chose the wrong piñata, but managed to earn €2,000.- for the group's pot.

Tags to Chests - Max. €3,250.-
Once again divided into duos, the two duos were sent into a swamp in speedboats to locate tags on branches. The tags displayed specific money amounts with different colors. The candidate not in a duo would be up in a helicopter and relay to the others where the matching colored chests were. The candidates had half an hour to get match as many tags with chests to retrieve as much money as possible. (See adjacent table for amounts.)

The group earned €1,250.- for the group's pot.

Episode 8

Blind Searching Blind - Max. €2,400.-
Placed throughout 4 floors on a yacht, each candidate received a map of a floor on the boat with red dots indicating a place where money is hidden. Candidates were not allowed to take the money on their own map, and must communicate with each other to get to other people's money spots. If two candidates see each other at any time during the hour time limit, then they were both out of the assignment and the money they collected is removed as well. If the candidates were successful, they could earn up to €2,400.-.

€500.- was added to the group's pot.

Minutes to Midnight - Max. €3,000.-
Pieter Jan left a box open for fifteen minutes in order for the candidates to "build their own time mechanism". Inside the box, the candidates were given two bottles and a knife. The goal was to stop the clock inside the box at midnight with a margin of two minutes before and after. The candidates were told the time was 3 hours and 45 minutes to midnight (8:15PM). The results were told in the morning after, and if the candidates were successful, they would earn €3,000.-.

The group failed the assignment and earned nothing for the group's pot.
 
Card Sharks - Max. €3,000.-
For the last time, the group had to divide themselves into duos. While driving to the assignment, Pieter Jan showed the candidates a map that they needed to copy in order to complete the assignment. With maps in hand, Pieter Jan handed the groups two decks of cards with two different cards missing in each. The candidates had to find their cards in a cave full of water. The map would be able to help them but would disintegrate in the water over time. Whichever team was able to find both of their missing cards before the other group would be in the race for an exemption.

After both duos found their missing cards, they then had to play poker against each other. If the duo who won the exemption beat the other, they would keep the exemption. If they lost, the exemption would be gone and the group would win €3,000 for the pot.

The exemption was lost, and the group earned €3,000.- for the group's pot.

Episode 9

Digging for Gold - Max. €5,000.-
For the final assignment to earn money for the pot, Pieter Jan showed the Finalists characteristics and they decided who that most closely describes. After choosing their characteristics, Pieter Jan assigned them objects: The chest, the crane, and the shovel. When taken to a digging site, the Finalists were told that their objects indicated the roles they would play in the assignment. The candidate with the Chest would be placed in a coffin and buried just underground, acting as the timer for the assignment. The Crane would use a crane to transport mounds of dirt that held gold bars. The Shovel's role was to dig through the dirt to find the gold bars. Every gold bar found was worth €500.-, and the assignment would last until every gold bar was found, or the candidate in the coffin had enough and elected to be taken out to fresh air.

The group earned €1,500.- for the winner's pot.

Mayan Mole Calendar
On the final day of the game, the Finalists attended a session of learning the Maya language and an explanation of how to Maya calendar works. Afterwards they were tasked to make the calendar show the birthday of who they thought was the Mole. After they had the birthday put into the calendar, they went to ask one question about the Mole to someone who only talks in the Maya language. If the birthday was right, he would give them a true answer to their question. If the birthday was wrong, he would give a false answer. This was the last time they could learn information about the Mole before the final test.

Finale

Towards the second half of Finale, scenes of the executed candidates attending a private debriefing in Lisse, Netherlands were shown. Discussing among themselves who the Mole between the finalists were after having watched the season's broadcast. The Reunion began with the Executed candidates discussing their feelings about their executions before being reunited with the Finalists and Pieter Jan to watch the unmasking of the Mole in Ek' Balam, Mexico. Edo arrived first to Pieter Jan, where the host highlighted to Edo that he had to switch Mole suspects when Patrick was executed right before the Finale. Afterwards, Pieter Jan revealed that Edo's switch was correct and that he had won The Mole. Next to meet Pieter Jan was Dennis, where the host gladly revealed to the audience, and Edo, that he was the Mole. Lastly, Regina was debriefed that despite surviving until the Finale and constantly switching Mole suspects, she had the losing finalist to her suspect, Edo.

Notes

Reception

Viewing Figures

Public response
In December 2008, Wie is de Mol? was voted as the best AVRO program in the last fifty years from a vote in Avrobode magazine. More than five thousand people voted in the poll, either through the Avrobode website or through postcards.

References

8
2008 Dutch television seasons
Television shows set in Mexico
Television shows filmed in Mexico